Weevil can mean:

Animals
Weevil, a sort of beetle
Wheat weevil

Arts, entertainment, and media

Fictional entities
Weevil (Torchwood), an alien race in Torchwood
Insector Haga - Weevil Underwood, a character in the Yu-Gi-Oh! universe
Eli "Weevil" Navarro, a supporting character in Veronica Mars
The Weevils, a fictional band on the show Back at the Barnyard

Music
Weevil (band), a band from Yorkshire, England
The Bo-Weevils, a psychedelic rock band

Other uses
Boll weevil (disambiguation)

See also

 
 
Weedle, a fictional creature from the Pokémon franchise
Weavel, a fictional character from Metroid Prime Hunters
Weever, a type of fish with poisonous spines on their first dorsal fins and gills
Weever (disambiguation)